Ripon Cricket Club are an English club cricket side based in the medieval city of Ripon, North Yorkshire. Formed in 1810 the club now plays in the York & District Senior Cricket League.

History
Ripon Cricket Club is one of the oldest clubs in Yorkshire and boasts a rich heritage. The club has played host to a number of renowned touring sides and the club's Studley Road ground is used frequently by the Yorkshire Second XI for their home fixtures.

Famous Players
Ripon boasts many players who have gone onto play cricket at the highest standard including the current club president Peter Squires who played first class cricket for Yorkshire County Cricket Club as well as representing England twenty nine times in Rugby Union, scoring six tries.

Popularity
The club fields three senior teams, a 1st XI who play in the York & District Senior League, a 2nd XI & 3rd XI who play in the Nidderdale League and an evening league side who play in the Harrogate and District Evening League.

The club also fields a strong junior setup featuring four junior teams. It also provides coaching for both boys and girls from age seven upwards.

References

1810 establishments in England
English club cricket teams
Cricket in North Yorkshire
Sports clubs established in the 1810s
Ripon